Lexington Catholic High School is a Roman Catholic high school located in the Rosemill neighborhood in Lexington, Kentucky. It is located in the Roman Catholic Diocese of Lexington. In 2007, it was named a Blue Ribbon School of Excellence.

History
The school was formed in 1951 through the merger of two secondary schools: St. Catherine's Academy, founded in 1823, and Lexington Latin High, founded in 1924. Lexington Catholic moved to its current location in 1957.

In 2007, the school was named a Blue Ribbon School of Excellence. It was the first high school in central Kentucky to receive the award.

Accreditation
Lexington Catholic is accredited by the Southern Association of Colleges and Schools and approved by the Kentucky State Department of Education. They have been given recognition for being a U.S. Department of Education Blue Ribbon School (one of three high schools in Kentucky chosen in 2007).

Notable alumni
 Laura Bell Bundy actress and singer
 Brian Cashman Major League Baseball executive
 Ann Cummings mayor of Montpelier, Vermont and member of the Vermont Senate
 Winston Guy professional football player
 Alison Lundergan Grimes 85th Secretary of State of Kentucky
 Bradlee Heckmann neuroimmunologist & biologist
 Frank Kornet former professional basketball player
 Nick Maronde professional baseball player
 Natalie Novosel professional basketball player
 Ben Revere professional baseball player

References

External links 
 

Educational institutions established in 1951
Lexington Catholic High School alumni
Roman Catholic Diocese of Lexington
Catholic secondary schools in Kentucky
Schools accredited by the Southern Association of Colleges and Schools
1951 establishments in Kentucky